Vladimir Filippovich Gorodetsky (born July 11, 1948) is a Russian politician serving as a Senator from the executive authority of Novosibirsk Oblast since 2018. He had previously served three terms as mayor of Novosibirsk, Russia from 2000 to 2014 and was the governor of Novosibirsk Oblast from 2014 to 2017.

Biography
Gorodetsky first moved to Novosibirsk in 1972, and spent ten years in the construction industry before being elected to leadership roles in local Communist Party organizations.  In the 1990s he spent a few years in business again, but in 1996 he was appointed first deputy mayor under Viktor Tolokonsky, who later became the Governor of Novosibirsk Oblast, and was responsible for economics, investment and industrial policy. 

He was elected mayor of Novosibirsk, Russia in 2000, and re-elected on March 28, 2004 with 58% of the vote in a run-off against Yakov London. He was elected to a third term in March 2009.

Gorodetsky was also president of the Association of Siberian and Far-Eastern Cities, a member of the Board of the Congress of Municipalities of the Russian Federation from 2003 to 2014 and work with the Euro-Asia section of the worldwide United Cities and Local Governments organisation.

He was considered for the 2008 World Mayor award.

In March 2014, Gorodetsky was appointed as acting governor of Novosibirsk Oblast to replace Vasily Yurchenko, who resigned. He was confirmed in the post by popular vote in September of that year, taking 65% of the votes. He resigned from the position in October 2017.

He is married, has a grown son and daughter, and four grandchildren.

References

External links
 Official Oblast Website 
 CityMayors profile
 Mayor Gorodetsky's personal website 

1948 births
Governors of Novosibirsk Oblast
Living people
Mayors of Novosibirsk
United Russia politicians
People from Pochinkovsky District, Smolensk Oblast
Members of the Federation Council of Russia (after 2000)